Spike: Lost and Found is a comic, a story based on the Angel television series.

Story description

Summary

A vampire is preying on citizens of Los Angeles in broad daylight making it particularly difficult for Angel and Spike to deal with. Meanwhile, Spike finds himself thinking about some of his evil actions in some new found guilt.

Expanded overview

Shortly after the events of  "The Harsh Light of Day" and "In the Dark," Spike returns to Harmony in Sunnydale. He tells her of his recent trip to Los Angeles, during which Spike had tried and failed to obtain the mystical Gem of Amarra. Spike explains that he had hired a vampire named Marcus to torture Angel for information on the gem's whereabouts, and had traded Angel to his friends in exchange for the Gem. Ultimately, Spike was betrayed by the very same vampire he had hired, who then stole the gem.

Four years later, Angel and Harmony are working at Wolfram & Hart. They see a television newscast about an attack that sounded very much like a vampire attack - eyewitnesses reported that the attacker had torn the victim's throat open with his teeth - but had occurred in broad daylight. Suspicious, Angel decides to pay Spike a visit at his apartment.

Upon his arrival, Angel must assure Spike that he doesn't suspect him of the crime - he simply wants information regarding the Gem. However, the last time Spike saw it, it was in the hands of Marcus, the vampire who stole it from him. Angel explains that he had defeated Marcus and destroyed the Gem, and Spike replies that the case is closed - the attacker couldn't possibly have used the Gem. Nonetheless, Angel brings Spike to Wolfram and Hart, where his people are conducting research of their own into the Gem's origins. Meanwhile, a vampire steps off a city bus in broad daylight and kills a fisherman and a security guard on the Santa Monica Pier.

At Wolfram and Hart, Spike explains to Angel and Wesley that he had conducted his own research in order to find the first Gem. Wesley says that his translation refers to the plural "Gems of Amarra," and Spike indignantly apologizes for not translating the ancient Sumerian Cuneiform perfectly. When Angel asks how he could have missed a second Gem in Sunnydale, Spike immediately turns his attention to Harmony. Harmony protests that Spike had told her she could take anything she wanted. To Wesley's chagrin, Harmony reveals she sold the second Gem of Amarra online for $75.

Spike and Angel track the buyer to his home, but he turns out to only be a middleman, and provides the true buyer's phone number. They track this number to the vampire's home, and later his job at a butcher shop. On the way, Spike confesses to feeling remorse about his actions in "The Harsh Light of Day" and "In the Dark."

They find the vampire at the market, and chase him onto another city bus. As they follow the bus in their car, Angel tells Spike that he won't forgive him for his actions, but he admits, "I'm no better." The vampire gets off the bus at a shopping mall, and Angel and Spike follow him inside. Spike chases the vampire down, while Angel ambushes him at an elevator. Angel then tackles the vampire, and they fall over a second-floor balcony. As Angel grapples with the vampire in a food court, Spike throws the blade from a meat slicer, severing the hand upon which the vampire is wearing the Gem. Spike then stakes the vampire with a mop handle.

As they return to the car, Angel tells Spike that he knows Spike took the Gem of Amarra after the fight, and implies that Spike will use it to reunite with Buffy. Spike instead destroys the Gem, saying, "maybe neither one of us deserves it."

Writing and artwork

The original title planned for this comic was Old Habits. This would have been consistent with the titles of IDW's other Spike one-shots, Spike: Old Times and Spike: Old Wounds.

Continuity

When Spike and Angel track the vampire to his workplace in a market, Spike expresses a desire to purchase a blooming onion, which he also admits to liking in episodes such as "Triangle" and "Empty Places."

Canonical issues

Angel comics such as this one are not usually considered by fans as canonical. Some fans consider them stories from the imaginations of authors and artists, while other fans consider them as taking place in an alternative fictional reality. However unlike fan fiction, overviews summarising their story, written early in the writing process, were 'approved' by both Fox and Joss Whedon (or his office), and the books were therefore later published as officially Buffy merchandise.

References

Angel (1999 TV series) comics
One-shot comic titles